Merge algorithms are a family of algorithms that take multiple sorted lists as input and produce a single list as output, containing all the elements of the inputs lists in sorted order. These algorithms are used as subroutines in various sorting algorithms, most famously merge sort.

Application 

The merge algorithm plays a critical role in the merge sort algorithm, a comparison-based sorting algorithm. Conceptually, the merge sort algorithm consists of two steps:

 Recursively divide the list into sublists of (roughly) equal length, until each sublist contains only one element, or in the case of iterative (bottom up) merge sort, consider a list of n elements as n sub-lists of size 1. A list containing a single element is, by definition, sorted.
 Repeatedly merge sublists to create a new sorted sublist until the single list contains all elements. The single list is the sorted list.

The merge algorithm is used repeatedly in the merge sort algorithm.

An example merge sort is given in the illustration. It starts with an unsorted array of 7 integers. The array is divided into 7 partitions; each partition contains 1 element and is sorted. The sorted partitions are then merged to produce larger, sorted, partitions, until 1 partition, the sorted array, is left.

Merging two lists 

Merging two sorted lists into one can be done in linear time and linear or constant space (depending on the data access model). The following pseudocode demonstrates an algorithm that merges input lists (either linked lists or arrays)  and  into a new list . The function  yields the first element of a list; "dropping" an element means removing it from its list, typically by incrementing a pointer or index.

 algorithm merge(A, B) is
     inputs A, B : list
     returns list
 
     C := new empty list
     while A is not empty and B is not empty do
         if head(A) ≤ head(B) then
             append head(A) to C
             drop the head of A
         else
             append head(B) to C
             drop the head of B
 
     // By now, either A or B is empty. It remains to empty the other input list.
     while A is not empty do
         append head(A) to C
         drop the head of A
     while B is not empty do
         append head(B) to C
         drop the head of B
 
     return C

When the inputs are linked lists, this algorithm can be implemented to use only a constant amount of working space; the pointers in the lists' nodes can be reused for bookkeeping and for constructing the final merged list.

In the merge sort algorithm, this subroutine is typically used to merge two sub-arrays ,  of a single array . This can be done by copying the sub-arrays into a temporary array, then applying the merge algorithm above. The allocation of a temporary array can be avoided, but at the expense of speed and programming ease. Various in-place merge algorithms have been devised, sometimes sacrificing the linear-time bound to produce an  algorithm; see  for discussion.

K-way merging

-way merging generalizes binary merging to an arbitrary number  of sorted input lists. Applications of -way merging arise in various sorting algorithms, including patience sorting and an external sorting algorithm that divides its input into  blocks that fit in memory, sorts these one by one, then merges these blocks.

Several solutions to this problem exist. A naive solution is to do a loop over the  lists to pick off the minimum element each time, and repeat this loop until all lists are empty:

 Input: a list of  lists.
 While any of the lists is non-empty:
 Loop over the lists to find the one with the minimum first element.
 Output the minimum element and remove it from its list.

In the worst case, this algorithm performs  element comparisons to perform its work if there are a total of  elements in the lists.
It can be improved by storing the lists in a priority queue (min-heap) keyed by their first element:

 Build a min-heap  of the  lists, using the first element as the key.
 While any of the lists is non-empty:
 Let .
 Output the first element of list  and remove it from its list.
 Re-heapify .

Searching for the next smallest element to be output (find-min) and restoring heap order can now be done in  time (more specifically,  comparisons), and the full problem can be solved in  time (approximately  comparisons).

A third algorithm for the problem is a divide and conquer solution that builds on the binary merge algorithm:

 If , output the single input list.
 If , perform a binary merge.
 Else, recursively merge the first  lists and the final  lists, then binary merge these.

When the input lists to this algorithm are ordered by length, shortest first, it requires fewer than  comparisons, i.e., less than half the number used by the heap-based algorithm; in practice, it may be about as fast or slow as the heap-based algorithm.

Parallel merge 
A parallel version of the binary merge algorithm can serve as a building block of a parallel merge sort. The following pseudocode demonstrates this algorithm in a parallel divide-and-conquer style (adapted from Cormen et al.).

 algorithm merge(A[i...j], B[k...ℓ], C[p...q]) is
     inputs A, B, C : array
            i, j, k, ℓ, p, q : indices
 
     let m = j - i,
         n = ℓ - k
 
     if m < n then
         swap A and B  // ensure that A is the larger array: i, j still belong to A; k, ℓ to B
         swap m and n
 
     if m ≤ 0 then
         return  // base case, nothing to merge
 
     let r = ⌊(i + j)/2⌋
     let s = binary-search(A[r], B[k...ℓ])
     let t = p + (r - i) + (s - k)
     C[t] = A[r]
 
     in parallel do
         merge(A[i...r], B[k...s], C[p...t])
         merge(A[r+1...j], B[s...ℓ], C[t+1...q])

It then splits the other array into a part with values smaller than the midpoint of the first, and a part with larger or equal values. Finally, each pair of halves is merged recursively, and since the recursive calls are independent of each other, they can be done in parallel. Hybrid approach, where serial algorithm is used for recursion base case has been shown to perform well in practice 

This is optimal since  elements need to be copied into . To calculate the span of the algorithm, it is necessary to derive a Recurrence relation. Since the two recursive calls of merge are in parallel, only the costlier of the two calls needs to be considered. In the worst case, the maximum number of elements in one of the recursive calls is at most  since the array with more elements is perfectly split in half. Adding the  cost of the Binary Search, we obtain this recurrence as an upper bound:

As a result, when used for sorting, this algorithm produces a sort that is not stable.

Parallel merge of two lists 

There are also algorithms that introduce parallelism within a single instance of merging of two sorted lists. These can be used in field-programmable gate arrays (FPGAs), specialized sorting circuits, as well as in modern processors with single-instruction multiple-data (SIMD) instructions. 

Existing parallel algorithms are based on modifications of the merge part of either the bitonic sorter or odd-even mergesort. In 2018, Saitoh M. et al. introduced MMS  for FPGAs, which focused on removing a multi-cycle feedback datapath that prevented efficient pipelining in hardware. Also in 2018, Papaphilippou P. et al. introduced FLiMS  that improved the hardware utilization and performance by only requiring  pipeline stages of  compare-and-swap units to merge with a parallelism of  elements per FPGA cycle.

Language support 

Some computer languages provide built-in or library support for merging sorted collections.

C++ 
The type of the elements merged must support the less-than operator, or it must be provided with a custom comparator.

C++17 allows for differing execution policies, namely sequential, parallel, and parallel-unsequenced.

Python 
Python's standard library (since 2.6) also has a  function in the  module, that takes multiple sorted iterables, and merges them into a single iterator.

See also 
 Merge (revision control)
 Join (relational algebra)
 Join (SQL)
 Join (Unix)

References

Further reading 
 Donald Knuth. The Art of Computer Programming, Volume 3: Sorting and Searching, Third Edition. Addison-Wesley, 1997. . Pages 158–160 of section 5.2.4: Sorting by Merging. Section 5.3.2: Minimum-Comparison Merging, pp. 197–207.

External links
High Performance Implementation of Parallel and Serial Merge in C# with source in GitHub and in C++ GitHub

Articles with example pseudocode
Sorting algorithms